Augustin Cochin (22 December 1876 – 8 July 1916) was a French historian of the French Revolution. Much of his work was posthumously published in an incomplete state after he was killed in action in World War I.

Career overview
Born in Paris, Cochin was the son of Denys Cochin, a Parisian deputy in the National Assembly with ties to the Vatican, and the grandson of Augustin Cochin, a French politician and writer. His Catholic upbringing helped him to remain detached from the French Revolution and study it historically in a new light.

Cochin studied the Revolution from a sociological perspective, cultivated from his interest in the work of Émile Durkheim, and he sought to look at the revolution from a social perspective. François Furet believed that Cochin's work worked towards an analysis of two objectives: “a sociology of the production and role of democratic ideology, and a sociology of political manipulation and machines.” 

Cochin was drafted into service in World War I in 1914, and he was wounded four times in service before being killed on 8 July 1916 at Maricourt, Somme.

His sometime collaborator, Charles Charpentier, worked with Cochin's family towards posthumous publication of his works.

See also
 Hippolyte Taine
 Jacques Godechot
 Pierre Gaxotte

Major works
 La Crise de l’Histoire Révolutionnaire: Taine et M. Aulard, Honoré Champion, 1909.
 Le Capitaine Augustin Cochin. Quelques Lettres de Guerre, (Préface de Paul Bourget), Bloud & Gay, 1917.
 Les Sociétés de Pensée et la Démocratie: Études d’Histoire Révolutionnaire, Plon-Nourrit et Cie., 1921.
 La Révolution et la Libre Pensée: la Socialisation de la Pensée (1759-1789); la Socialisation de la Personne (1789-1792); la Socialisation des Biens (1793-1794), Plon, 1924.
 Les Sociétés de Pensée et la Révolution en Bretagne (1788-1789), Champion, 1925.
 Les Actes du Gouvernement Révolutionnaire (23 août 1793 – 27 juillet 1794), 3 Vol., A. Picard et Fils, 1920-1935.
 Abstraction Révolutionnaire et Réalisme Catholique, Desclée, de Brouwer & Cie., 1936.
 L'Esprit du Jacobinisme: une Interprétation Sociologique de la Révolution Française, Presses Universitaires de France, 1979.

Works in English translation
 "The Subversive Influence of the Philosophes and the Sociétés de Pensée." In: William F. Church (ed.), The Influence of the Enlightenment on the French Revolution. Boston: D. C. Heath and Company, 1964, pp. 61–67.
 Organizing the Revolution: Selections from Augustin Cochin, Chronicles Press/The Rockford Institute, 2007.

References

Further reading
 Bénéton, Philippe (1996). "The Great Misunderstanding." In: The Legacy of the French Revolution, Rowman & Littlefield, pp. 175–185.
 Halévi, Ran (1986). "L'Idée et l'Événement: Sur les Origines Intellectuelles de la Révolution Française," Le Débat, No. 38, pp. 145–163.
 Martin, Gaston (1926). Augustin Cochin et la Révolution. Toulouse: Éditions du Bon Plaisir.
 Meaux, Antoine de (1928). Augustin Cochin et la Genèse de la Révolution.  Paris: Plon.
 Porset, Charles (1990). "Les Francs-maçons et la Révolution (autour de la "Machine" de Cochin)," Annales Historiques de la Révolution Française, No. 279, pp. 14–31.
 Schrader, Fred E. (1989). "Réalisme Catholique et Sociologie de la Révolution: le Projet Historiographique d'Augustin Cochin (1909-1916)," Cahiers Georges Sorel, Vol. VII, No. 7, pp. 163–206.
 Schrader, Fred E. (1992). Augustin Cochin et la République Française. Paris: Le Seuil.
 Sonenscher, Michael (1990). "The Cheese and the Rats: Augustin Cochin and the Bicentenary of the French Revolution," Economy and Society, Vol. 19, No. 2, pp. 266–274.
 Winnie, L. H. (1988). Aegis of the Bourgeoisie: the Cochins of Paris, 1750-1922. Doctoral Dissertation, University of Michigan.

External links
 
 Works by Augustin Cochin, at Hathi Trust
 La Révolution et la Libre-Pensée (pdf).
 Les Sociétés de Pensée et la Démocratie Moderne (pdf).

École Nationale des Chartes alumni
20th-century French historians
Historians of the French Revolution
French military personnel killed in World War I
1876 births
1916 deaths
Anti-Masonry
French male non-fiction writers